The Ba'e River is a river of Papua New Guinea, located in Eastern Highlands Province, in Ayura Valley.

See also
List of rivers of Oceania

Rivers of Papua New Guinea
Eastern Highlands Province